WXAJ (99.7 MHz) is a commercial FM radio station, licensed to Hillsboro, Illinois, and serving the Springfield metropolitan area.   It is owned by the Neuhoff Corporation and broadcasts a hot adult contemporary radio format, known as "99.7 The Mix".  The radio studios and offices are on South 4th Street in Southern View, Illinois, using a Springfield address.

WXAJ has an effective radiated power (ERP) of 50,000 watts, the current maximum for most FM stations in Illinois.  The transmitter is on County Road 900 East, off Front Street (Illinois Route 48) in Harvel, Illinois.

History
The frequency first went on the air in 1991 and has been owned by Clear Channel Media + Entertainment, among other companies. It is now owned by Neuhoff Communications "Media Made Locally".

From 2002 to March 5, 2017,  the station aired a Contemporary hit radio (Top 40/CHR) format as "99.7 Kiss FM".

In January 2016, the station's sound evolved from the Top 40/CHR format by adding titles from the early 2000s and 1990s.  It became an adult top 40, leaning toward rhythmic contemporary. To reflect the shift, WXAJ's slogan was changed from "All Of Today's Best Music" to "Springfield's #1 Best Hit Music Station". 

On March 6, 2017, at 6 a.m, the station shifted to a Hot Adult Contemporary format, and re-adopted the earlier "99-7 The Mix" moniker.  It now promotes itself as the home for "The 90s, 2k & Today".

References

External links

XAJ
Montgomery County, Illinois
Radio stations established in 1991
Hot adult contemporary radio stations in the United States
Adult top 40 radio stations in the United States